Stepfanie Kramer (born Stephanie Lyla Kramer; August 6, 1956) is an American actress best known for having played Detective Sgt. Dee Dee McCall on the 1980s NBC police series Hunter. She was nominated for an Emmy in Special Class Programming and won Outstanding Performance by a Lead Actress from First Americans in the Arts Awards in 1995, 2002, and 2003. Kramer has written and directed for television, and is also a singer-songwriter.

Early life
Kramer was born and raised in Los Angeles, California. She is part Native American from her mother's side. She graduated from Chatsworth High School in 1974.  Her father was a classical violinist and her mother is an artist.

Career
Kramer's professional acting career started in the late 1970s, while she was still in school. Kramer graduated from the American Academy of Dramatic Arts/West, where she has occasionally taught as a guest instructor. Kramer starred in the NBC sitcom We Got It Made in 1983. Her big break came in 1984, when she landed a starring role as Sgt Dee Dee McCall in the internationally popular crime drama Hunter, a creation of television mogul Stephen J. Cannell. After a rough start, the show was broadcast for seven consecutive seasons. Kramer starred in six of them, appearing in 130 episodes. In an interview with Jay Leno in 1989, Kramer admitted that she had not believed the show would be as long-lived as it was, and was grateful for its global popularity and long lasting run.
 
In 1986, Kramer stated she was working on a rock album with composer Mike Post, who had penned music for Hunter. She announced that she might put out an album the following year. No album was forthcoming, though, and in 1990, Kramer announced her departure from Hunter. The press said it was to concentrate on her music career.

Shortly after leaving Hunter, she began recording an album in England with producer Nils Lofgren. The album was never released. In 1992, Kramer married. Two years later, she gave birth to a daughter. She continued to write music and star in made-for-TV movies and indie films. She is a trained mezzo-soprano, and during  her TV career, she used her musical abilities on several episodes of Hunter, as well as on Bob Hope television specials. Kramer's first album One Dream was released on October 12, 1999.  It contains 10 adult contemporary songs. Most are originals. The Great American Song Book, her second album, was released in early 2008. On it, Kramer covers 14 classic songs recorded live in a one-woman show which she performs in various national venues. In 2008, she represented the US at the International Music Festival in Queretero, Mexico.

After her departure from Hunter, she appeared in several TV shows and movies. Her most notable movie projects include Coins in a Fountain, Twin Sisters (1992), Beyond Suspicion (1994), Deceived by Trust (1995), The Dogwalker (1999), and The Cutting Edge: Going for the Gold (2006). She reprised her role as Dee Dee McCall in the two Hunter television movies which were the highest rated films of the year for NBC(2002 and 2003). NBC attempted to bring back the popular television show, but the 2003 revival was canceled after only three episodes.

Kramer teamed with writer/producer David Chisolm to write feature films, as well as writing feature films and television projects with writer/producer Chip Hayes. Kramer starred in a book reading of the New York musical A Twist of Fate. She was a special guest in the Los Angeles stage production of Menopause—The Musical.

She made a guest appearance on Pure Flix's internet series The Encounter, playing attorney Dee Sanders. She portrayed the matriarch Kate Meade in the CW series The Secret Circle (2012). In 2019, she appeared as Susan in the feature film Crossing. Kramer portrayed Dorothy Calvin in the Hallmark film A Merry Christmas Match in 2020. She also co-produced, along with David Chisholm, a new stage production "Doc Holliday The Musical" in Los Angeles. In 2021, she portrayed Sandra Holden on NCIS.

Honors and awards
In 2015, Kramer was honored as an Icon of Television at the 55th Golden Nymph Awards International Television Festival in Monte Carlo. She returned in 2016 serving as a member of the Fiction Jury. In 1985 she co hosted the Macy's Thanksgiving Day Parade, and was nominated in the Daytime Emmy awards for Outstanding Special Class Program for the Macys Thanksgiving Day Parade. In 1996 at the First Americans in the Arts awards (FAITA), she won for Outstanding Lead Performance by an Actress in the TV movie "Deceived by Trust." In 2003 at the First Americans in the Arts Awards (FAITA), she won for Outstanding Lead Performance by an Actress in the TV movie "Hunter: Return to Justice." In 2004 at the First Americans in the Arts Awards (FAITA), she won for Outstanding Performance by an Actress in the TV movie "Hunter: Back in Force."

Filmography 
 NCIS (TV series) (2021) — Sandra Holdren
 9-1-1 (TV series) (2020) — Janet
 A Merry Christmas Match (2019) — Dorothy Calvin
 CSI: Crime Scene Investigation — Vivian Brentson (1 episode, 2012)
 The Secret Circle (2012) — Kate Meade
 The Cutting Edge: Going for the Gold (2006) — Kate Mosley-Dorsey
 Hunter: Back in Force (2003) — Det. Sgt. Dee Dee McCall
 Hunter: Return to Justice (2002) — Det. Sgt. Dee Dee McCall
 Twice in a Lifetime — Delia Harmony/Dana Rudolph (1 episode, 2000)
 The Dogwalker (1999) — Helene
 Moloney — Rebecca Kitchens (1 episode, 1997)
 Thrill (1996) — Teresa Colson
 Abducted: A Father's Love (1996) — Loretta Hymens
 Deceived by Trust (1995) — Sarah Ann Collins
 Beyond Suspicion (1994) — Karen Rikehardt
 Twin Sisters (1992) — Carol Mallory/Lynn Cameron
 Coins in the Fountain (1990) — Nikki Taylor
 Take My Daughters, Please (1988) — Jessica Fletcher
 Favorite Son (1988) TV mini series — Stevie Chandler
 Bridge Across Time (1985) — Angie
 Hunter — Det. Sgt. Dee Dee McCall (130 episodes, 1984–1990)
 The A-Team — Fire Chief Annie Sanders (1 episode, 1984)
 Mike Hammer — Lisa (1 episode, 1984)
 We Got It Made — Claudia Jones (22 episodes, 1983–1984)
 Riptide — Tracy (1 episode, 1984)
 The Dukes of Hazzard — Anna Louise (2 episodes, 1984)
 The Man with Two Brains (1983) — Beautiful Girl Hit by Car
 Trapper John, M.D. — Cheryl (2 episodes, 1981–1982)
 The Devlin Connection — Gwendoline Adams (1 episode, 1982)
 Knots Landing — Marni (2 episodes, 1981–1982)
 Bosom Buddies — Jennifer (1 episode, 1981)
 Dynasty — Melanie (2 episodes, 1981)
 Vegas — Cathy (1 episode, 1980)
 Married: The First Year (1979) — Sharon Kelly
 The Secret Empire — Princess Tara (unknown episodes, 1979)
 Fantasy Island — Contessa Christina Kastronova/Denise Morot (2 episodes, 1979)
 The Runaways (1 episode, 1978)
 The Hardy Boys/Nancy Drew Mysteries — Jill Sommers (1 episode, 1978)
 Eight Is Enough (1 episode, 1978)
 Starsky and Hutch — Manicurist (1 episode, 1977)

References

External links 

American people who self-identify as being of Native American descent
Actresses from Los Angeles
1956 births
American television actresses
20th-century American actresses
Living people
21st-century American women
Native American people from California